Peter Jozzeppi Burns (5 August 1959 – 23 October 2016) was an English singer, songwriter and television personality. In 1979, he founded the band Nightmares in Wax; in 1980 changes were made to the band's line-up and the name was changed to Dead or Alive. Burns was the band's lead vocalist and principal songwriter. The band rose to mainstream success with their 1984 single "You Spin Me Round (Like a Record)".

Burns rose to further celebrity status in the British media following his appearance on Celebrity Big Brother 4, in which he finished in fifth place. He appeared on further television reality shows, including as a presenter. He was known for his ever-changing (and often androgynous) appearance, which he freely admitted was greatly modified by cosmetic surgery that eventually bankrupted him and caused health problems later in his life.

Early life
Peter Jozzeppi Burns was born on 5 August 1959 in Port Sunlight, Cheshire. He had an older brother named Tony (born 1948). Although the two scarcely saw each other, they got on well and liked to listen to records together. Like Burns, Tony was an aspiring pop star. Burns' mother, Evelina Maria Bettina Quittner von Hudec (1913–1987), was German-born (Heidelberg) and, according to Burns' autobiography Freak Unique (2006), her first marriage was to a German Freiherr. As her father was Jewish, she moved to Vienna to escape the Nazis. At a tea dance in Vienna, she met an English soldier from Liverpool named Francis Burns. Evelina was 46 years old when she gave birth to Burns. He later wrote of his childhood in his autobiography in which he described his mother's alcoholism and suicide attempts but maintained that she was "absolutely the best mother in the world".

Burns spoke German until he was five, which resulted in local children spending days outside his house shouting "Heil Hitler". According to Burns, school was "almost non-existent", and his mother frequently kept him away so he could spend the day with her. He dropped out of school at the age of 14 after being summoned to the headmaster's office because he had arrived at school with "no eyebrows, Harmony-red hair, and one gigantic earring". At around this age, he was raped by a man who took him for a drive. He later recalled that he was not upset by the experience, although he knew that people would expect him to be. He stated that he already knew the man, who drove him to Raby Mere and threatened him with an air gun.

Career

Dead or Alive

While building his career, Burns worked at a Liverpool record shop, Probe Records, which became a meeting place for local musicians. Burns was notorious for his maltreatment of customers, sometimes throwing their purchases at them because he disapproved of their selection. Burns first performed as a member of the short-lived punk band Mystery Girls, which included Pete Wylie and Julian Cope, who gave only one performance, supporting Sham 69 at Eric's Club in November 1977. Cope stated that Burns's performing style drew on that of the transgender punk performer Wayne County.

Burns was next in Nightmares in Wax, a group that formed in Liverpool in 1979; they released a 12" single, "Black Leather", and a 7" single, "Birth of a Nation", each containing the same three songs, but never released a studio album. In 1980, after replacing several members, Burns changed the band's name to Dead or Alive.

After a minor hit in 1984 with a cover version of "That's the Way (I Like It)", the band had a number-one hit in the UK in 1985 with "You Spin Me Round". The song went on to become a worldwide hit.

Burns did not have ambition to be a singer. He said that he hated the sound of his voice, and wished he had been able to sing falsetto like Sylvester. He had an uncomfortable relationship with the corporate music industry, and expressed disgust at the way it functioned. He always refused to allow record company staff to hear his music before it was completed, which "didn't make [the executives] very pleased".

Media career
In December 2003, the BBC apologised to its viewers after Burns swore once on its pre-9pm watershed Liquid News show when asked about his views on the Michael Jackson trial.

In January 2006, Burns appeared on Channel 4's Celebrity Big Brother 4, eventually reaching fifth on the show's final episode. It was on this show that he declared that one of his coats was made out of gorilla fur – this caused outrage amongst animal rights activists and unlicensed gorilla fur is illegal in the United Kingdom. Police subsequently confiscated the coat and tests were performed on it that revealed that it was not gorilla, but was made out of the fur of colobus monkeys. Colobus monkeys are also an endangered species whose fur requires a licence, although experts believed that the fur had been imported in the 1930s or '40s, before it became illegal to import colobus fur in 1975.

Burns appeared in the first episode of the ninth series of the UK version of Celebrity Wife Swap. His partner Michael Simpson went to live with former Page 3 model Leah Newman, while Burns lived with Newman's partner, the footballer Neil Ruddock. Burns was featured in a documentary, with a medium, exploring his rough and harmful childhood.

Solo music career and collaborations
In the mid-1990s Burns collaborated with the Italian Eurodance duo Glam to produce the single "Sex Drive", which was later re-recorded for Dead or Alive's sixth studio album Nukleopatra. In the early 2000s Burns recorded the single "Jack and Jill Party" with the Pet Shop Boys.

On 7 September 2010 Burns's solo single "Never Marry an Icon", produced and co-written by the Dirty Disco, was released to the iTunes Store. The single was released by fellow Dead or Alive member Steve Coy's label, Bristar Records. Burns's final musical appearance was on Big Brother's Bit on the Side, where he sang "You Spin Me Round". His last appearance itself was on Celebrity Botched Up Bodies in September 2016.

Personal life

Relationships
Burns married Lynne Corlett in Liverpool on 8 August 1980. He met Corlett in a Liverpool hair salon where they both worked. They divorced in 2006. 

He entered a civil partnership with his boyfriend Michael Simpson shortly afterward in 2007. Burns stated in a Howard Stern interview that his husband has a daughter.

On the topic of his sexuality, Burns stated, "[People] always want to know – am I gay, bi, trans or what? I say, forget all that. There's got to be a completely different terminology and I'm not aware if it's been invented yet. I'm just Pete." He also stated that he always identified himself as male and never had intentions of being a woman: "It freaks me that someone could think I was a woman. Don't get me wrong – I love women; I love men, too, and I'm very proud to be a man."

Image and health
Pete Burns was known for his ever-changing, often androgynous appearance, which he freely admitted was greatly modified by cosmetic surgery. Burns had extensive polyacrylamide injections into his lips, cheek implants, several rhinoplasties and many tattoos. Burns at one time accused fellow pop star Boy George of appropriating his unique image.

In early 2006, Burns revealed in an interview that he had spent most of his life savings on 18 months of reconstructive surgery after a cosmetic procedure on his lips went wrong. In January 2007, he announced that he was planning to sue the cosmetic surgeon, Maurizio Viel, who performed his faulty lip surgery, for £1 million. Surgery-related health problems experienced by Burns included pulmonary embolisms and near-fatal blood clots.

In March 2009, Burns was admitted to a London hospital after collapsing from a kidney ailment. He was diagnosed with seven large kidney stones, which were removed with laser surgery.

Legal issues
Paparazzi followed Burns around after his arrest for assault in 2006 (the charges were later dropped) and his attempts to revive his career premiered in the documentary Pete Burns Unspun on Living TV, which alleged he briefly lived with a fan due to bail conditions.

Burns was declared bankrupt in December 2014 and was evicted from a rented flat in April 2015 for non-payment of over £34,000 in rent.

Death and funeral
In May 2016, Burns sparked concerns when he was seen in public appearing bloated and dishevelled.

Pete Burns died in London following a sudden cardiac arrest on 23 October 2016, at the age of 57. People who paid tribute to him after his death included Boy George, who described Burns as "one of our great true eccentrics", Marc Almond, who described Burns as a "one off creation, a fabulous, fantastic, brilliant creature..." and former MP George Galloway, who had appeared with him on Celebrity Big Brother and said Burns was "a cross between Oscar Wilde and Dorothy Parker... you don't get more brilliant than that".

On 29 October, the opening celebrity dance routine for BBC's Strictly Come Dancing was performed to Dead or Alive's "You Spin Me Round (Like a Record)". After the number, hosts Claudia Winkleman and Tess Daly paid tribute to Burns and sent their condolences to his family.

Boy George paid for the costs of Burns' funeral, despite the two artists' rivalry during their parallel music careers.

Published works

Books

Solo discography

Singles
Source:

References

Sources

External links

 
 
 
 "Where Are They Now?" from the BBC

1959 births
2016 deaths
English pop singers
English new wave musicians
British hi-NRG musicians
British synth-pop new wave musicians
English male singer-songwriters
Dead or Alive (band) members
20th-century English male singers
21st-century English male singers
Epic Records artists
English LGBT songwriters
English LGBT singers
Bisexual songwriters
Bisexual men
Bisexual singers
Male-to-female cross-dressers
Male new wave singers
Musicians from Cheshire
Musicians from Merseyside
Singers from Cheshire
Singers from Merseyside
Big Brother (British TV series) contestants
People from Bebington
English autobiographers
English expatriates in Japan
Scouse culture of the early 1980s
English people of German-Jewish descent
English people of Scottish descent
English baritones
People known for their body modification
20th-century English LGBT people
21st-century English LGBT people